KPUG (1170 AM) is a sports radio station located and licensed in Bellingham, Washington, transmitting from an antenna located off Sunset Drive.  KPUG is operated by the Cascade Radio Group, owned by Saga Communications. The majority of local sports taking place in and around Whatcom County are broadcast on KPUG.

KPUG serves Northwest Washington with a signal that reaches into Vancouver and Victoria in Canada and also reaches into Seattle's northern suburbs (daytime only) and the Olympic Peninsula.

KPUG On-Air Shows
Local Programming:
 “The Zone with Doug Lange & Mark Scholten”

Syndicated Shows:
 “Keyshawn, JWill and Max”
 “The Dan Patrick Show”
 “The Jim Rome Show”
 “Greeny”
 "Chiney and Golic Jr."
 “Spain and Fitz”
 “Freddie and Fitzsimmons”
 “SportsCenter All Night"

Local Sports:
 “Seattle Kraken”
 “Seattle Mariners”
 “Seattle Seahawks”
 “Washington Huskies Football & Basketball”
 “Washington State Cougars Football”
 “Sehome High School”
 “Bellingham High School”
 “Squalicum High School”
 “Lynden High School”
 “Ferndale High School”

National Sports:
 “Monday Night Football”
 “Sunday Night Football”
 “NHL”
 “NFL”
 “NBA”
 “MLB”
 “NCAA”
 “ESPN”

History
KPUG began broadcasting in early 1948 on 1170 kHz with 1,000 watts of power. It was an affiliate of the Don Lee Network. The station's principal owner was Mrs. Jessica Longston.

References

External links

PUG
CBS Sports Radio stations
ESPN Radio stations
Radio stations established in 1948
1948 establishments in Washington (state)